Promethium is a chemical element with symbol Pm and atomic number 61.

Promethium may also refer to:

Fictional entities
 Promethium, a fictional petroleum-based fossil fuel as well as a refined napalm-like substance in Warhammer 40,000
 Promethium, the name of the Mechanic Empire's queen in the fictional universe of Leiji Matsumoto
 Promethium (Marvel Comics), a fictional, magical metal in the stories published by Marvel Comics

See also
 Prometheum, a genus of plants in the family Crassulaceae
 Pm (disambiguation)
 Proscenium, the concept of space in live theater
 Prometrium, a brand name of the drug progesterone